Alex McAvoy (10 March 1928 – 16 June 2005) was a Scottish actor known for his roles as Sunny Jim in the BBC Scotland adaptation of Neil Munro's Para Handy stories, The Vital Spark, and as the teacher in Pink Floyd's musical film, The Wall.

As a young man McAvoy enrolled at the School of Art in Glasgow's Renfrew Street before, in the 1950s, joining the Royal Scottish Academy of Music and Drama in Glasgow. As a young actor he played the Citizens Theatre in Glasgow's Gorbals district alongside such future stars as John Cairney and Mary Marquis.

In the earlier part of his career McAvoy ventured into variety and light entertainment and was the first foil to Scottish comedy singer Andy Stewart.

He developed a love of mime and featured in Scottish pantomime, with featured roles at the King's Theatres in both Glasgow and Edinburgh. He later went to Paris to study and work in L'École Internationale de Théâtre Jacques Lecoq.

His many television roles included parts in The Bill, Dad's Army and Z-Cars as well as more serious parts in Sunday night dramas on British television. In the cinema, he memorably played the sadistic schoolteacher in Pink Floyd – The Wall (1982), and also had roles in Country Dance (1970), Venus Peter (1989, as the Beadle) and Strictly Sinatra (2001). He also featured in Pink Floyd's video EP of The Final Cut (1983).

Filmography

References

External links

Obituary in The Stage

1928 births
2005 deaths
20th-century Scottish male actors
21st-century Scottish male actors
Male actors from Glasgow
Scottish male stage actors
Scottish male television actors
Deaths from leukemia
Alumni of the Royal Conservatoire of Scotland
L'École Internationale de Théâtre Jacques Lecoq alumni